Serdang Depot (Malay: Depoh Serdang) is a future depot under construction located on the Mass Rapid Transit in Serdang, Selangor, Malaysia. The depot will be built at the site of the Universiti Putra Malaysia (UPM) research estate. The depot also houses a central maintenance with train overhaul facilities for trains on the Putrajaya Line. Together with the Sungai Buloh Depot the Serdang Depot will be the major depot for the new MRT lines.

Petaling District
Rail yards in Malaysia